The Legend of Haolan is a 2019 Chinese television series starring Wu Jinyan, Mao Zijun and Nie Yuan. It was broadcast on iQiyi from January 19 to March 24, 2019, and was one of the most highly anticipated television dramas of the year.

Despite the show's good ratings, it failed to live up to the success of 2018's Story of Yanxi Palace.

Synopsis
The series is set during the Warring States period (3rd century BC), and chronicles the rise of Li Haolan to become the Empress Dowager.

Betrayed by her family and her first love, Li Haolan finds herself in desperate circumstances at the start of the series. Her father, State Censor Li He, arranges marriage between her and the far-older Yu Ping, who treats his other wives brutally. When she tries to circumvent this fate by begging her first love, Prince Jiao, ask to marry her, Li Haolan's stepmother, Gao Min, orders her killed and thrown into the river. Surviving only by chance, Li Haolan crawls back from the brink of death to discover her reputation in tatters, as Gao Min spread the rumor that Li Haolan shamed the family by eloping with a stranger to explain the girl's disappearance. Li Haolan's mother, Wang Wan'er, a lowly concubine, has gone mad with grief over her daughter's unknown fate. Gao Min orders the murder of Li Haolan's mother and sells Li Haolan into slavery, just as Li Haolan watches her sweetheart marrying her little sister, Li Xiuyu.

Stricken with the knowledge of everyone's complicity, and unable to return home, Li Haolan vows she will never beg for another thing in her life as she tries to claw her way out of her fallen circumstances and avenge the death of her mother and the wrongs done to her. The scheming merchant Lü Buwei purchases Li Haolan and takes interest in the fate of this intelligent, unusual girl. Together, they form an unlikely partnership as they both begin to climb the ladders of power.

Through Lü Buwei's influence, Li Haolan enters Zhao's imperial court and makes a match with Ying Yiren, the captive prince of Qin. As Qin and Zhao fall into war, the balance of power may find itself upended, with Li Haolan on top.

Cast

Main

 Wu Jinyan as Li Haolan / Zhao Ji
 Li He's eldest daughter, by Wang Wan'er. Intelligent, talented, and kind, this favored daughter of a high official becomes a woman fiercely determined to avenge the  wrongs done to her and gain enough power to ensure no one can bend her pride again after she is sold into slavery. Because they are on the same path for power, she makes a pact with Lü Buwei to act as his partner. She is unafraid to call out misbehavior and demands she be treated fairly. She eventually becomes the wife of King Zhuangxiang of Qin and the mother of Qin Shi Huang, the first emperor of China.
 Nie Yuan as Lü Buwei
 A scheming merchant with a reputation for cunning and excellent business sense, Lü Buwei understands the importance of appearance and connections. Despite being from the wealthiest family in Zhao, the upper classes were allowed to step on Lü Buwei and his father due to their merchant status, causing him to vow that, one day, he would have more power and influence than them all. He often hides his altruism under the guise of profit scheming and is never afraid to take advantage of a bad situation, causing others to misunderstand him.
 Mao Zijun as Ying Yiren/Zichu
 Lord Anguo's son, by his concubine Xia Ji, adopted by his wife Lady Huayang. A prince of Qin, later known as King Zhuangxiang of Qin and the father of Qin Shi Huang, the first emperor of China. Initially the insignificant 27th prince of Qin, Yiren is held in the Zhao imperial court as a royal hostage to ensure the compliance of his home country of Qin. He loves art and music, and is kind to those beneath him, but hates his captors. His warm, pleasant demeanor hides chilly depths.

Supporting

Zhao

 Wang Zhifei as Zhao Dan
 King Xiaocheng of Zhao. A specially known lover of beauty and dancing girls, the King of Zhao can be superstitious and fills his harem with easy distractions.
 Ning Jing as Lady Li
 King Xiaocheng's queen. Often overlooked, Queen Li is extremely intelligent and extremely bored. She easily sees through most schemes, including Haolan's, though she favors keeping the knowledge to herself. Li Haolan's quick wits endear her to the Queen, who makes Haolan her maid-in-waiting as a form of amusement and mental exercise.
 Yin Xu as Lady Yun Chisu
 A dancing girl, later King Xiaocheng's concubine. Mother of Prince Yu.
 Yang Caiying as Lady Mei
 King Xiaocheng's concubine. Unable to get pregnant as a result of the devilry of Lady Li.
 Zhang Nan as Han Qionghua
 A princess of Han, later King Xiaocheng's concubine. Lover of Prince Yu.
 Hong Yao as Prince Jiao
 King Xiaocheng's eldest son, by his concubine Lady Gao, adopted by his queen Lady Li. Li Xiuyu's husband. He shared a first love with Li Haolan and vowed to her that they'd marry. Self-important and selfish, he has very high political aspirations, which Li Haolan's status as concubine-born would have inconvenienced. Because of this, he looks the other way when Haolan is in danger and marries her younger sister. He is quick to impetuously demand his way and not afraid to spread false accusations to get it.
 He Fengtian as Prince Yu
 King Xiaocheng's second son, by his concubine Lady Yun.
 Zhao Yiqin as Prince Yi
 King Xiaocheng's third son, by his concubine Lady Yuan.
 Hai Ling as Princess Ya
 King Xiaocheng's daughter, by his Queen Lady Li. The fiery spirit of a warrior trapped in the body of the King's favorite and most-indulged daughter. She fancies herself in love with the hostage prince of Qin, Prince Yinren. In temperament, Princess Ya resembles a child crushing to death a bird she's caught and is loving to death. A creature of extreme opposites: she is both smotheringly obsessive and possessive towards the things she wants, but dismissive and destructive of everything else. She is also quickly bored and changeable once she gets what she desires.
 Liu Enshang as Zhao Sheng
 Lord Pingyuan. The Prime Minister of Zhao. Interacting with the normal classes more often than his superiors and savvy at navigating the ridiculous whims of the upper nobility, the Prime Minister is a surprisingly practical and intelligent official who does much to ensure the state continues to function equally and practically.
 Nan Fulong as Gongsun Qian, a general.
 Jiang Zixin as Yin Xiaochun
 A physician. No-nonsense doctor who does not accept bribes. Yin Xiaochun is a rare female physician and the best doctor in the Zhao court.
 Lu Zhongtai as The Director of the Grand Diviners.
 Yang Hongwu as Gao Meng, a general.
 Pei Zitian as Gao Haoyang, a general.
 Yao Weiping as Lian Po, a general.
 Lian Lian as Xiao Hongye, Lady Li's servant.
 Zhang Jingru as Azhao, Lady Li's servant.
 Shi Jingzi as Lüzhu
 Han Qionghua's servant, later Lady Li's servant.
 Chen Haoming as Xiaxue
 Princess Ya's servant.
 Du Lingli as Baihe
 A servant in Xuri Palace.

Lü household

 Wen Haibo as Lü Xin, Lü Buwei's father.
 Gao Yu'er as Yao Ji, Lü Buwei's dancing girl.
 Zheng Long as Situ Que
 Situ Yue's elder brother. Lü Buwei's servant.
 Zhang Yixi as Situ Yue
 Situ Que's younger sister. Lü Buwei's servant, later a servant in the palace.

Bai household

 Yu Yankai as Bai Qi, Lord Wu'an.
 Li Chuan as Bai Zhong, Bai Qi's son.
 Pu Guanjin as Bai Ling'er, Bai Qi's daughter. She is silly and capricious, and doesn't think about the consequences of her actions. She falls in love with Lu Buwei and tricks Yiren into arranging her marriage to him. Ling'er never stops loving Lu, who is longing for Haolan, and meets her death sacrificing her life for him.

Li household

 Shen Baoping as Li He
 Li Haolan's father. The Censor of Zhao. Motivated by personal and familial glory and willing to take hand ups to get it. Li He is aware of the truth behind Li Haolan's circumstances, but, despite his apparent sorrow over the situation of his favorites, makes no effort to champion her or her mother since he benefits from their suffering.
 Lu Ling as Wang Wan'er
 Li He's first wife/concubine, Li Haolan's mother. Though legally his wife and first in his affections, Li He used Wang Wan'er's foreign status to disregard the law and demoted her from her position as main wife, reducing her to a concubine, when the rich and powerful Gao Min expressed her desire to marry him.
 Wang Lin as Gao Min
 Li He's main wife. Cruel and calculating, Gao Min thinks little of taking brutal action against others in her quest to get what she desires. She uses her family affluence and shark-like intelligence to rule the Li family.
 Li Chun'ai as Li Xiuyu
 Li He's younger daughter, by his second wife Gao Min. Prince Jiao's wife. Though close as children, Li Xiuyu has long envied her more talented and favored older sister, Li Haolan, and ultimately shows her true colors as an adult.
 Liu Shitong as Fangcao
 Gao Min's servant, later Li Xiuyu's servant.

Yu household

 Wang Jianguo as Yu Ping
 The Minister of Criminal Justice of Zhao. Yu Ping has a brutish reputation and several of his past wives have died under suspicious circumstances. The Li family owes Yu Ping and offending him could have dire consequences. Yu Ping's undesired request for Li Haolan's hand in marriage sets her initial fall from grace.
 Gong Zhengnan as Yu Hao
 Yu Ping's eldest son. A petty bully with none of the intelligence of his father, but all of the entitlement.

Qin

 He Qiang as Ying Ji
 Ying Yiren's grandfather. Lord Anguo's father. King Zhao Xiang of Qin.
 Wang Maolei as Ying Zhu
 Ying Yiren's father. Lord Anguo. The Crown Prince of Qin, later King Xiaowen of Qin.
 Tan Zhuo as Lady Huayang
 A lady of the Mi clan of Chu. Lord Anguo's wife. Ying Yiren's adoptive mother. The future Queen of Qin and Queen Dowager Huayang of Qin.
 He Jiayi as Xia Ji
 Lord Anguo's concubine. Ying Yiren's mother. The future Queen Dowager Xia of Qin.
 Wang Yu as Ying Zixi, Lord Anguo's son.
 Fang Anna as Siluo, Ying Yiren's concubine. Siluo is extremely jealous of Haolan and is neglected by Yiren. She is executed after her numerous crimes against Haolan and the state are revealed.
 Tong Mengshi as Ying Zheng
 Ying Yiren's eldest son, by his wife Li Haolan. A prince of Qin, later the Crown Prince of Qin and Qin Shi Huang.
 Zhu Jian as Lao Ai, Youngest son of King of Han.
 Saved by Haolan because he claims to be Han Qionghua's younger step-brother. Admires Haolan. (Historically Haolan's hidden lover, according to Sima Qian)

Fan household

 Tan Jianchang as Fan Ju, The Prime Minister of Qin.
 Xu Muchan as Fan Ya, Fan Ju's daughter.
 Gu Kaili as Fan Ya's nanny.

Chu

 Zhao Jiuyi as Xiong Wan
 The Crown Prince of Chu, later King Kaolie of Chu.
 Liu Min as Lady Xiong
 Lady Huayang's elder sister. Wife of Marquis Xuan.
 Zhou Yunshen as Xiong Chen
 Lady Huayang's younger brother. Lord Yangquan.

Others

 Tang Xiangen as Zhu Xian
 Hong Shiya as Cheng Xiu
 killed by Lü Buwei.
 Wang Meixin as Pang Min
 Daughter of a Qin Officer. Admirer of Prince Yu.

Production
The series was filmed from December 20, 2017, to April 8, 2018.

The series was originally slated to have 63 episodes, but the 63rd and final episode was cut due to historical inaccuracies. The new finale is a narrated voiceover at the conclusion of Episode 62.

Awards and nominations

International broadcast

References

External links
 
 

Chinese historical television series
2019 Chinese television series debuts
Television series set in the Qin dynasty
Television series by Huanyu Film
IQIYI original programming
Chinese web series
2019 Chinese television series endings
2019 web series debuts